Gifu is the capital city of Gifu Prefecture, Japan.

Gifu (岐阜) may also refer to:
Gifu Prefecture, located in the Chūbu region of central Japan
Gifu (region), a region located in southcentral Gifu Prefecture
Gifu Castle atop Mt. Kinka in the city of Gifu
Gifu University, in Gifu, Japan
the Gifu meteorite of 1909, which fell in Mino, Gifu (see also Meteorite fall#Others)
Battle of Gifu Castle in Japan in 1600
"The Gifu", a Japanese stronghold on Guadalcanal during World War II, captured during the Battle of the Gifu in December 1942